"Bye Bye Bird" is a harmonica-driven blues song written by Willie Dixon and Sonny Boy Williamson II. In 1963, Checker Records issued it as the B-side of Williamson's single "Help Me", which was his last single to reach the record charts.

The song was recorded on January 11, 1963, by Williamson on vocal and harmonica, backed by Lafayette Leake or Billy Emerson on organ, Matt Murphy on guitar, Milton Rector on bass, and Al Duncan on drums.

"Bye Bye Bird" is included on several Sonny Boy Williamson compilation albums, such as More Real Folk Blues (1967) and His Best (1997). A live recording by Williamson from December 8, 1963, at the Crawdaddy Club, in Richmond, England, accompanied by the Yardbirds, is included on Sonny Boy Williamson and the Yardbirds (1966).

The song was recorded by the Moody Blues for their 1965 debut album The Magnificent Moodies.

References

1963 songs
1963 singles
Blues songs
Songs written by Willie Dixon
Sonny Boy Williamson II songs
The Moody Blues songs
The Yardbirds songs